Valjalo is a surname. Notable people with the surname include:

 Antonio Valjalo (1926–2013), Chilean footballer
 Brandon Valjalo (born 1998), South African skateboarder
 Nina Valjalo (1908–2018), Croatian supercentenarian
 Oleg Valjalo (born 1970), Croatian politician